Hanif Mohammad PP (21 December 1934 – 11 August 2016) was a Pakistani cricketer. 
He played for the Pakistani cricket team in 55 Test matches between the 1952–53 season and the 1969–70 season. He averaged 43.98 scoring twelve centuries. At his peak, he was considered one of the best batsmen in the world despite playing at a time when Pakistan played very little Test cricket; Hanif played just 55 Test matches in a career spanning 17 years. In his obituary by ESPNcricinfo, he was honoured as the original Little Master, a title later assumed by Sunil Gavaskar and Sachin Tendulkar. He was the first Pakistani to score a triple hundred in a Test match.

Life and career
Hanif was trained by Abdul Aziz, an Afghan cricket player, who had earlier played in Ranji Trophy for Jamnagar and father of Indian cricketer, Salim Durani. He made his first-class debut playing for Pakistan against the MCC in November 1951. He made 26 in 165 minutes. His Test debut was in Pakistan's first ever Test match against India in October 1952, where he was the top scorer of Pakistan's first innings. 

The highest of Hanif's Test centuries was a famous 337 made against West Indies in a six-day test at Bridgetown in 1957/58. It is still the highest score by a player in away Tests. After Pakistan found itself following on from a first-innings deficit of 473 runs on the afternoon of the third day, Hanif spent more than sixteen hours at the crease compiling his runs, allowing Pakistan to draw the game. It remains the longest innings in Test history (and stood as the longest in all first-class cricket for over 40 years). It was the only Test match instance of a triple century in a team's second innings until it was equaled by New Zealand cricketer Brendon McCullum against India in 2014. Displays such as this earned him the nickname "Little Master". Hanif Mohammad also has the world record for scoring the slowest test triple century in terms of minutes (858) and the only player in test history to have spent over 970 minutes to score a test triple ton.

In 1958–59, he surpassed Don Bradman's record for the highest individual first-class innings. Hanif made 499 for Karachi in a match against Bahawalpur before being run out attempting his five hundredth run; this stood for more than 35 years before being passed by Brian Lara in 1994. It was the first instance of a triple and quadruple century being scored in the Quaid-e-Azam Trophy. In all he made 55 first-class centuries and finished with a strong first-class career average of 52.32. He could bowl with either arm, and kept wicket on a number of occasions. He is known to have played the slowest test innings when he scored 20 off 223 balls at a strike rate of 8.97.

Hanif's career lasted until 1975–76, but he never played in the English County Championship, although he did have an outing for the Northamptonshire Second XI in August 1965 whilst preparing for his appearance for a Rest of the World XI against England at the Scarborough Festival a few days later. Hanif was named as a Wisden Cricketer of the Year in 1968 and in January 2009 he was named along with two other Pakistani players, Imran Khan and Javed Miandad, among the inaugural batch of 55 inductees into the ICC's Hall of Fame.

In one Test match against Australia, Hanif scored a century in the first innings. In the second, he was given out stumped by Barry Jarman off the bowling of Tom Veivers for 93. Hanif respected the umpire's decision. Later in a press conference Jarman admitted that Hanif was not out.

In 1972, after retiring from international cricket, Hanif co-founded the magazine The Cricketer Pakistan. He edited this magazine for two decades. He also served as the team manager for Pakistan International Airlines (PIA).

Batting performance

Family members 
Many other members of Hanif's family were also cricketers: his brothers Mushtaq, Sadiq and Wazir all played Tests for Pakistan, as did his son Shoaib. Another brother Raees was once twelfth man for Pakistan, and four nephews had first-class careers. His mother Ameer Bee was a national badminton champion in pre-independence British India.

Death
Hanif Mohammad was diagnosed with lung cancer in 2013. He had been undergoing treatment for lung cancer in Karachi's Aga Khan Hospital. He died on 11 August 2016 at age 81.

Tribute, awards and recognition 
In 2018, a Google Doodle was created to celebrate his 84th Birthday. Hanif's triple-century against the West Indies team in 1957/58 made him a legend in the cricketing world. He was one of the original inductees into the ICC Cricket Hall of Fame.

Pride of Performance Award in 1959 by the Government of Pakistan

References

External links

Ramachandra Guha : The original little master, The Hindu (newspaper)

 
 

1934 births
2016 deaths
People from Junagadh
Pakistani people of Gujarati descent
Pakistan Test cricketers
Pakistan Test cricket captains
Karachi cricketers
Commonwealth XI cricketers
International Cavaliers cricketers
Wisden Cricketers of the Year
Recipients of the Pride of Performance
Pakistani cricketers
Cricketers from Karachi
Bahawalpur cricketers
South Zone (Pakistan) cricketers
Karachi Whites cricketers
Karachi A cricketers
Pakistan International Airlines cricketers
Pakistan International Airlines A cricketers